Arthur Alan Middleton is a professor of Physics and the associate dean of the College of Arts and Sciences at Syracuse University. He is known for his work in the fields of disordered materials such as random magnets, spin glasses, and interfaces in a random environment, transport in disordered materials, interface motion, and colloidal assemblies, condensed matter physics, statistical physics, and computational physics, connections between algorithm dynamics, computer science analyses, algorithms for efficient simulation of complex dynamics, including heuristic coarse graining for glassy materials.

Education
Middleton earned his Bachelors in Mathematics and Physics with distinction at Harvey Mudd College in 1984. He received Churchill Scholarship and moved to Cambridge University where he earned a certificate of advanced study. He also received the NSF-GRFP grant from the National Science Foundation in 1984. Middleton joined Princeton University in 1986 and earned a PhD in Physics in October 1990.

Career

In 1990, Middleton started postdoctoral research associate in the Physics department at Syracuse. From 1992 to 1994, he was a visiting scientist at the NEC Research Institute in Princeton, New Jersey.

He joined the Department of Physics, Syracuse University in 1995 as an assistant professor and became a full professor in 2008. He served as the department chair from 2013 to 2017. Middleton was named the associate dean of the College of Arts and Sciences in 2017.

Middleton formulated the Biham–Middleton–Levine traffic model along with Ofer Biham and Dov Levine in 1992.

Awards
Middleton was elected a fellow of the American Physical Society in 2010 for "his innovative numerical studies of the dynamical and static properties of disordered condensed matter systems, including charge density waves, spin glasses and disordered elastic media".

He received the Alfred P. Sloan Foundation Fellowship in 1995.

Middleton was elected Fellow of the American Association for the Advancement of Science in 2016.

See also
Biham–Middleton–Levine traffic model

References

External links

Syracuse University Profile

Year of birth missing (living people)
Living people
21st-century American physicists
20th-century American physicists
Princeton University alumni
Alumni of the University of Cambridge
Harvey Mudd College alumni
Syracuse University faculty
Fellows of the American Physical Society
Fellows of the American Association for the Advancement of Science